Gaël Monfils was the defending champion, but did not participate.

Nikolay Davydenko won the title, defeating Florian Mayer 7–6(8–6), 5–7, 6–4 in the final.

Seeds

Draw

Finals

Top half

Bottom half

References
Main Draw
Qualifying Draw

Orange Warsaw Open
2006 ATP Tour